Slampe Parish is an administrative unit of Tukums Municipality, Latvia, in the region of Semigallia. The administrative center is Slampe.

Towns, villages and settlements of Slampe parish 
 Ozolnieki
 Praviņi
 Slampe
 Spirgus
 Sprosti
 Vīksele
 Zvaigznes
Cinevilla Studios

See also 
 Praviņi Station
 Slampe Station

External links

Parishes of Latvia
Tukums Municipality
Semigallia